The Grand Anwar Mosque, also called Al-Anwar Mosque or simply Anwar Mosque and sometimes "Jama'a Salat" ("place where people pray"), is the largest and oldest mosque in Addis Ababa, Ethiopia located in a place of Merkato within Arada district. It was built by Italians around 1922 and finished with assistance of Muslim funds after 16,000 birr remained unpaid for contractor.

Overview
Grand Anwar Mosque is located in Merkato, in Arada district of Addis Ababa. It was built by the Italian government around 1922. The mosque is the largest and one of the oldest mosques (masjid) in Addis Ababa. The mosque has unique architecture with white and green colors. 

After the Italians left unfinished, Muslims collected money to resume the construction. When the construction completed, 16,000 ETB were not paid to the contractor, which led to closure for couple of days by court order. The mosque then reopened as an individual covered payment. 

During fasting periods, thousands of people gather in the mosque compound and man can carry incense to smell inside the mosque. A portable podium placed to the middle of green pillars supporting the white outer walls and domes that form spectacular façade of the mosque.

Notable incidents
 On 21 February 1995, violent clash erupted between the police and supporter of the then second vice-chairman of the Ethiopian Supreme Council for Islamic Affairs, causing 40 members of Muslim elite arrested and 9 people deaths. The incident produced shock among Muslim residents and a number of Islamic periodicals were ceased for publication since 1991. Between late 1995 and early 1996, there were eight tabloids published in Amharic that contains religious and secular subjects and relevant ideas connected to Islam. The distribution of these papers has been contentious among Islam community which believed the press publication in Amharic could shape the Muslim culture.
 On 11 December 2015, a grenade attack occurred during evening prayers which left 10 people wounded according to the government. Information Minister Getachew Reda said the attack was under investigation and authorities remained unsure.

References

Religious buildings and structures in Ethiopia
Mosques in Ethiopia